The 80th World Science Fiction Convention (Worldcon), also known as Chicon 8, was held on 1–5 September 2022 in Chicago, Illinois, United States.

Participants

Guests of Honor 

 Tananarive Due and Steven Barnes (author)
 Edie Stern (fan)
 Joe Siclari
 Erle Korshak died in 2021
 Annalee Newitz (toastmaster)
 Charlie Jane Anders (toastmaster)
 Charles de Lint (author) declined due to family reasons
 Floyd Norman (artist) declined for personal reasons

2022 Hugo Awards 

The winners were:

 Best Novel: A Desolation Called Peace by Arkady Martine
 Best Novella: A Psalm for the Wild-Built by Becky Chambers
 Best Novelette: "Bots of the Lost Ark" by Suzanne Palmer
 Best Short Story: "Where Oaken Hearts Do Gather" by Sarah Pinsker
 Best Series: Wayward Children by Seanan McGuire
 Best Graphic Story or Comic: Far Sector, written by N. K. Jemisin, art by Jamal Campbell
 Best Related Work: Never Say You Can't Survive by Charlie Jane Anders
 Best Dramatic Presentation, Long Form: Dune, screenplay by Jon Spaihts, Denis Villeneuve, and Eric Roth; directed by Denis Villeneuve; based on the novel Dune by Frank Herbert
 Best Dramatic Presentation, Short Form: The Expanse: "Nemesis Games", written by Daniel Abraham, Ty Franck, and Naren Shankar; directed by Breck Eisner
 Best Professional Editor, Short Form: Neil Clarke
 Best Professional Editor, Long Form: Ruoxi Chen
 Best Professional Artist: Rovina Cai
 Best Semiprozine: Uncanny Magazine
 Best Fanzine: Small Gods, by Lee Moyer and Seanan McGuire
 Best Fancast: Our Opinions Are Correct, presented by Annalee Newitz and Charlie Jane Anders, produced by Veronica Simonetti
 Best Fan Writer: Cora Buhlert
 Best Fan Artist: Lee Moyer
 Lodestar Award for Best Young Adult Book (presented by the World Science Fiction Society): The Last Graduate, by Naomi Novik
 Astounding Award for Best New Writer (presented by Dell Magazines): Shelley Parker-Chan

Site selection 

The following committees announced bids for hosting the convention:

 Chicago in 2022
 Jeddah, Saudi Arabia in 2022

The site was selected by members of the 78th World Science Fiction Convention. Chicago received 517 first-preference votes and Jeddah received 33.

See also 

 Hugo Award
 Science fiction
 Speculative fiction
 World Science Fiction Society
 Worldcon

References

External links 
 
 
 List of current Worldcon bids

2022 conferences
Science fiction conventions in the United States
Worldcon